Mikola is the name of:

Surname
 Ananda Mikola (born 1980), Indonesian racecar driver
 István Mikola (born 1947), Hungarian physician and politician, Minister of Health from 2001 to 2002
 Nándor Mikola (1911–2006), Finnish-Hungarian painter

Given name
 Saint Nicholas of Mozhaysk or Mikola Mozhaiski, a Russian variation of the Saint Nikolaus traditions
 Mikola Abramchyk (1903–1970), Belarusian journalist and politician
 Mikola Statkevich (born 1956), Belarusian politician
 Mikola Yermalovich (1921–2000), Belarusian writer and historian

See also
Mikolas
Saint Nicholas Day (known as Mikołajki in Polish)

Belarusian masculine given names